Anne Lomas (born 2 July 1953 in Helensville, New Zealand) is an international lawn bowls competitor for New Zealand.

Bowls career
She won double gold at the 2000 World Outdoor Bowls Championship in Moama, Australia when winning the triples and fours events.

Lomas also won bronze medal in the women's fours at the 2002 Commonwealth Games.

She won four medals at the Asia Pacific Bowls Championships, of which two have been gold medals.

References

Living people
1953 births
New Zealand female bowls players
Commonwealth Games bronze medallists for New Zealand
Bowls players at the 2002 Commonwealth Games
Bowls World Champions
Commonwealth Games medallists in lawn bowls
People from Helensville
Medallists at the 2002 Commonwealth Games